Jade Hannah (born 24 January 2002) is a Canadian swimmer. She competed at the 2017 World Junior Swimming Championships in Indianapolis where she was part of a Canadian team that set the junior world record and championship record in the girl's 4×100 m medley.

Career
In the 2017 World Junior Swimming Championships, Hannah won four medals at the world junior championships, including three gold and one bronze. She was the reigning junior co-world champion in the 50 m backstroke and won a bronze in the 100 m backstroke. 

Hannah added to her world junior medal haul when she added two golds at the 2019 World Junior Swimming Championships in the 100 m and 200 m backstroke, as well as a silver in the 50 m backstroke. She also won two more bronze in the 4×100 m medley and 4×100 m mixed medley. This brought her career world junior total to five gold, one sliver and three bronze medals, a sum of nine in all. In September 2017, Hannah was named to Canada's 2018 Commonwealth Games team.

At the age of 14 in September 2016, Hannah and her mother made the move from her hometown of Halifax, Nova Scotia to Victoria, British Columbia in order to train with High Performance Center in Victoria, BC. June of 2020, Hannah moved to Toronto to train at the High Performance centre under Ben Titley at one of Canada's elite training facilities for the country's top swimmers.

Personal bests

Long course (50 m pool)

Short course (25 m pool)

References

External links
 
 

2002 births
Living people
Canadian female swimmers
Sportspeople from Halifax, Nova Scotia
Swimmers from Victoria, British Columbia
Swimmers at the 2018 Commonwealth Games
Commonwealth Games competitors for Canada
21st-century Canadian women